Andrew Hughes Carr (13 March 1908 – 1983) was an English professional footballer who played in the Football League for Crewe Alexandra, Mansfield Town, Middlesbrough and Rochdale.

References

1908 births
1983 deaths
English footballers
Association football defenders
English Football League players
Percy Main Amateurs F.C. players
Washington Colliery F.C. players
Middlesbrough F.C. players
Mansfield Town F.C. players
Crewe Alexandra F.C. players
Rochdale A.F.C. players